Marcel Klefenz (born 20 April 1986) is a German former footballer who played as a defender.

Career
Klefenz made his professional debut in the 3. Liga for VfR Aalen on 21 August 2010, starting in the match against SV Babelsberg, which finished as a 1–3 away loss.

References

External links
 Profile at DFB.de
 Profile at kicker.de

1986 births
Living people
Sportspeople from Heidelberg
Footballers from Baden-Württemberg
German footballers
Association football defenders
SC Freiburg II players
TSG 1899 Hoffenheim II players
VfR Aalen players
3. Liga players
Regionalliga players
21st-century German people